Breuningiana pulchra is a species of beetle in the family Cerambycidae, and the only species in the genus Breuningiana. It was described by Karl Jordan in 1894.

References

Tragocephalini
Beetles described in 1894